Dasharatha Maurya was the 4th Mauryan emperor from 232 to 224 BCE. He was a grandson of Ashoka The Great and is commonly held to have succeeded him as the imperial ruler of India. Dasharatha  presided over a declining imperium and several territories of the empire broke away from central rule during his reign. He had continued the religious and social policies of Ashoka. Dasharatha was the last ruler of the Mauryan dynasty to have issued imperial inscriptions—thus the last Mauryan Emperor to be known from epigraphical sources.

Dasharatha died in 224 BCE and was succeeded by his cousin Samprati.

Background
Dasharatha was a grandson of the Mauryan ruler Ashoka. He is commonly held to have succeeded his grandfather as imperial ruler in India although some sources including the Vayu Purana have given different names and numbers of Mauryan Emperors after Ashoka. Of the grandsons of Ashoka, the two most frequently mentioned are Samprati and Dasharatha. The latter is described in the Vishnu Purana as the son and imperial successor of Suyashas (a son of Ashoka). It has been suggested that Suyash was an alternative name of Ashoka's son and presumptive heir Kunala.

Administration
Historians Vincent Smith and Romila Thapar advanced the popular theory of a division of the Mauryan Empire amongst Kunala and Dasharatha after the death of Ashoka. In some of the sources the division is recorded as having been between Samprati and Dasharatha, the latter holding the eastern parts with the capital at Pataliputra and the former the western imperium with the capital at Ujjain. However, Smith also wrote that "there is no clear evidence to support [the] hypothesis."

The Vayu and Brahmanda Puranas mention three Mauryan rulers—Bandhupalita, Indrapalita and Dasona—whose identification is rather difficult. It has been suggested that they may have been members of a branch line of the Maurya dynasty whom Dasharatha had appointed as regional governors for the convenience of administration.

The political unity of the Mauryan Empire did not long survive Ashoka's death. One of Dasharatha's uncles, Jalauka, set up an independent kingdom in Kashmir. According to Taranatha, another Mauryan prince, Virasena declared himself king in Gandhara. Vidarbha also seceded. Evidence from Greek sources confirm the loss of the north-western provinces which was then ruled by the Mauryan ruler Sophagasenus (Subhagasena, probably a successor of Virasena). There is also much modern speculation about a possible east–west division of the empire involving Dasharatha and another Mauryan ruler. Epigraphic evidence indicates that Dasharatha retained imperial power in Magadha. 

Various dynasties of the south including the Satavahana had been feudatories of the Mauryan Empire. These kingdoms are mentioned in Ashoka's edicts (256 BCE) and were considered part of the outer circle of the imperium—subject to the rule of the Mauryan Emperor, although doubtless enjoying a considerable degree of autonomy under their local rulers. The death of Ashoka began the decline of imperial power in the south. Dasharatha was able to maintain some command of the home provinces, but the distant governments, including areas in the south, broke away from imperial rule and reasserted their independence. The Mahameghavahana dynasty of Kalinga in central-eastern India also broke away from imperial rule after the death of Ashoka.

According to a Jain text, the provinces of Surashtra, Maharashtra, Andhra, and the Mysore region broke away from the empire shortly after Ashoka's death, but were reconquered by Dasharatha's successor, Samprati (who supposedly deployed soldiers disguised as Jain monks).

Religion

Ashoka had displayed divine support in his inscriptions; although a Buddhist ruler, he was  called Devanampiya, which means "Beloved of the Gods" in Pali. The title of Devanampiya and religious adherence of the Mauryan ruler to Buddhism was continued by Dasharatha.

Dasharatha is known to have dedicated three caves in the Nagarjuni Hills to the Ajivikas. Three inscriptions at the caves refer to him as "Devanampiya" and state that the caves were dedicated by him shortly after his accession.

Nagarjuni caves inscriptions by Dasaratha Maurya

Dasaratha Maurya, Ashoka's grandson and regnal successor, wrote dedicatory inscriptions in the three forming the Nagarjuni group (Gopika, Vadathi and Vapiya caves) of the Barabar Caves. It is generally considered that their construction dates from his reign.

The three caves were offered to the Ajivikas upon the accession to the throne of Dasaratha, confirming that these were still active around 230 BCE, and that Buddhism was not the exclusive religion of the Mauryas at that time.

The three caves are also characterized by an extremely advanced finish of the granite walls inside, which again confirms that the technique of "Mauryan polish" did not die out with the reign of Ashoka.

Succession
Samprati, who succeeded Dasharatha, was according to the Hindu Puranas, the latter's son and according to the Buddhist and Jain sources, Kunala's son (making him possibly a brother of Dasharatha). The familial relationship between the two is thus not clear although evidently they were closely related members of the imperial family.

Notes 

Mauryan emperors
3rd-century BC Indian monarchs
224 BC deaths
Year of birth unknown
Indian Buddhists
Indian Buddhist monarchs